Pango (stylized as Παν語) is a text (i.e. glyph) layout engine library which works with the HarfBuzz shaping engine for displaying multi-language text.

Full-function rendering of text and cross-platform support is achieved when Pango is used with platform APIs or third-party libraries, such as Uniscribe and FreeType, as text rendering backends. Pango-processed text will appear similar under different operating systems.

Pango is a special-purpose library for text and not a general-purpose graphics rendering library such as Cairo, with which Pango can be used. The Cairo documentation recommends Pango be used to "render" text rather than Cairo for all but the simplest text "rendering".

History and naming 
The name pango comes from Greek pan (παν, "all") and Japanese go (語, "language").

In January 2000, the merger of the GScript and GnomeText projects was named Pango.

Pango version 1.0.0 was released 11 March 2002.

Support for OpenType features

Pango 1.17 and newer support the  feature tag that allows localized glyphs to be used for the same Unicode code point. Assuming you have Verdana version 5.01 installed, which supports the locl feature for the latn/ROM (Romanian) script, a quick demonstration (on Linux) is:
for lang in en ro; do pango-view \
 --font="Verdana 64" \
 --text "şţ vs. șț in $lang" \
 --language=$lang; done

For an explanation of the substitutions rules for Romanian, see this discussion.

Setting the locale via the POSIX environment variable, e.g. LANG=ro_RO.UTF-8 will also cause Pango to use locl font feature. Finally, you can change the language on the fly in the same text using Pango markup, e.g.:
pango-view \
 --font="Verdana 24" \
 --markup \
 --text 'In the same text: şţ(en) and <span lang="ro">şţ(ro).</span>'

Since 1.37.1, Pango added more attributes to provide complete support for processing OpenType feature.

The official showcase of Pango's script-aware features is here.

Major users

Pango has been integrated into most Linux distributions. The GTK UI toolkit uses Pango for all of its text rendering. The Linux versions of the Mozilla Firefox web browser and Mozilla Thunderbird mail client use Pango for text rendering.

See also

 HarfBuzz (text shaping engine which is incorporated into Pango itself but can be also used stand-alone)
 Core Text (modern multilingual text rendering engine introduced in Mac OS X 10.5)
 Graphite (multiplatform open source smart-font renderer)
 WorldScript (Old Macintosh multilingual text rendering engine)
 Typographic ligature
 Computer font

References

External links
 
 Pango, an open-source Unicode text layout engine. by Owen Taylor in Twenty fifth Internationalization and unicode conference, April 2004
 "Pango: internationalized text handling" Owen Taylor in Ottawa linux symposium 2001
 Pango Reference Manual
 , at linux.conf.au 2017 Simon Cozens explained the rendering of fonts

Computer-related introductions in 1999
C (programming language) libraries
Free computer libraries
Free software programmed in C
Freedesktop.org libraries
GNOME libraries
GTK
Software that uses Meson
Text rendering libraries